Cerastium nigrescens, commonly known as the  Shetland mouse-ear, Shetland mouse-eared chickweed or Edmondston's chickweed, is an endemic flowering plant found in Shetland, Scotland.

It was first recorded in 1837 by botanist Thomas Edmondston, who was 12 at the time. For a long time it was synonymised with arctic mouse-ear Cerastium arcticum but it is now widely regarded as a separate species. Although reported from two other sites in the 19th century, it currently grows only on two serpentine hills on the island of Unst (see Keen of Hamar).

The numbers of Cerastium nigrescens can vary dramatically from year to year, for reasons that are unclear (probably due to a varying rates of seedling germination and survival), but the underlying trend seems stable, and there has been no change in its distribution.

Mature plants may be not much more than a single shoot with one flower or can be a fist-sized cushion with as many as 40 flowers. Flowers look disproportionately large compared with the size of the plant.

References

Scott, W. & Palmer, R. 1987. The Flowering Plants and Ferns of the Shetland Islands. Shetland Times, Lerwick.
Scott, W. Harvey, P., Riddington, R. & Fisher, M. 2002. Rare Plants of Shetland. Shetland Amenity Trust, Lerwick.

External links

nigrescens
Endemic flora of Scotland
Biota of Shetland
Plants described in 1837
1837 in Scotland
Endemic biota of the Scottish islands